Christopher Carl Cavanaugh (born July 1, 1962) is an American former competition swimmer  former world record holder in the 50 meter freestyle and Olympic champion.  He was a member of the winning U.S. team in the 4×100-meter freestyle relay at the 1984 Summer Olympics in Los Angeles, and was also a member of the U.S. Olympic team when the United States led a boycott of the 1980 Summer Olympics in Moscow.

Cavanaugh was an All-American swimmer and elected team captain for the USC Trojans swimming team at the University of Southern California, where he also played water polo and graduated in 1986.

Cavanaugh has volunteered as a celebrity swimmer for various charitable organizations including Swim Across America, a charitable organization that raises money for cancer.  He now coaches and swims Masters having held many Masters National record.  He also works with USS, and club swimmers at all levels.  He resides in San Jose, California and currently serves as president of the board of directors of Santa Clara Swim Club.

See also
 List of Olympic medalists in swimming (men)
 List of University of Southern California people
 List of World Aquatics Championships medalists in swimming (men)
 World record progression 50 metres freestyle
 World record progression 4 × 100 metres freestyle relay

References

External links

 

1962 births
Living people
American male freestyle swimmers
American swimming coaches
World record setters in swimming
Olympic gold medalists for the United States in swimming
Pan American Games gold medalists for the United States
People from Hialeah, Florida
Swimmers from San Jose, California
Swimmers at the 1983 Pan American Games
Swimmers at the 1984 Summer Olympics
USC Trojans men's swimmers
World Aquatics Championships medalists in swimming
Medalists at the 1984 Summer Olympics
Pan American Games medalists in swimming
Medalists at the 1983 Pan American Games